Harumi is the debut album by Japanese musician Harumi (full name Harumi Ando). The album was produced by producer Tom Wilson. Prior to this, Wilson had produced recordings by artists such as Bob Dylan, Simon & Garfunkel, Frank Zappa and The Mothers Of Invention, and The Velvet Underground.

Recording and content 
The album was recorded sometime between 1967 and 1968 in New York. Very little is known about the recording of the album aside from what is on the sleeve of the record. Key personnel such as backing musicians are absent from the album credits.

The first disc of the album is primarily songs of conventional length and style, with the longest of these lasting 4:15. The second disc is composed of two side-long tracks lasting 24:01 ("Twice Told Tales of the Pomegranate Forest") and 18:11 ("Samurai Memories"). "Twice Told Tales of the Pomegranate Forest" is a sparsely-instrumented English spoken word piece featuring Harumi and New York DJ William "Rosko" Mercer. "Samurai Memories" is much more musically frantic, featuring Japanese spoken word vocals credited to Harumi and his family.

Release and reception 

While the exact release date of the album is unknown, the March 23, 1968, issue of Billboard magazine features the record in its "New Album Releases" section. This places the album's release date between March 16, 1968, and March 23, 1968, in the United States.

Upon its release, Verve labelmate and Wilson-affiliate Frank Zappa dismissed the album, calling it a "flower-power album".

Advertising efforts for the album seemed to be on par with Harumi's Verve Forecast labelmates, with a full page advertisement and a promo photo existing as well as a promotional single of the tracks "Talk About It" and "First Impressions" that was distributed to radio stations. Furthermore, Harumi appeared on the hour-long promotional radio show "The Music Factory". On this show hosted by the album's producer, Tom Wilson, Harumi was interviewed in between select tracks from his album and other Verve Forecast artists.

Seemingly, Harumi went on a five-week tour to both promote the album as well as perform. This proposed tour would start on April 16, 1968, in Boston, Massachusetts, and end in Honolulu, Hawaii, with 13 other major American cities visited in between. It is unknown how much of this tour actually came to fruition.

Some of the album's songs eventually found themselves associated with other artists. The Chicago psychedelic soul band Rotary Connection included a performance of the song "Caravan" (stylized as "I Took A Ride (Caravan)") on their 1968 album Aladdin. Some of the songs have also found themselves utilized in sample culture as well. Part of the song "Hunters of Heaven" was sampled by the avant-garde rock band The Residents on their 1972 debut EP Santa Dog. The same song was later sampled in 2002 by Jazzanova for their song "Another New Day".

Original copies of Harumi have proven to be collectors' items, with a sealed copy selling at auction for a price of 678 USD on August 22, 2015. This desire has led to two recent reissues, one in 2007 and one in 2018.

There is a death notice in the United States Social Security Death Index for a man named Harumi Ando, who was born on January 11, 1944, and died on January 7, 2007. If this was the same Harumi Ando, he would have been 23-24 during the recording of the album. Additionally, a 2006 article in Downtown Express, which describes tensions between the landlord and tenants of an apartment building in Manhattan, mentions a "[Harumi] Ando, a photographer who has lived in the top floor loft since 1975." It is not known whether either of these sources are referring to the musician Harumi, but given the rarity of the name (the name Harumi has feminine connotations in Japan), it is quite likely that they are the same individual.

Track listing

Personnel 

 Harumi - Vocals, primary performer, composer, arranger, spoken word on Side C and Side D
 William "Rosko" Mercer - Spoken word on Side C
 Harumi's Parents and Sister - Spoken word on Side D
 Tom Wilson - Producer
 Larry Fallon - Arranger
 Harvey Vinson - Arranger
 H. H. Cohen - Spoken word direction (Side D)
 Gary Kellgren - Engineer, remix engineer
 Mark D. Joseph - Personal Direction
 Sherri Berri - Artwork and Photography
 Hinode Design - Jacket Design

Release history

References 

1968 albums
Psychedelic pop albums
Psychedelic music albums by Japanese artists